Shake the Shudder is the seventh studio album by American dance-punk group !!!, released on May 19, 2017, on Warp Records. The band described the album as a "fancy way of saying 'shake it off and dance your cares away.'"

Reception

Shake the Shudder received generally positive reviews. On Metacritic, the album has received a weighted average score of 64, indicating "generally favorable reviews", based on 12 reviews. Stuart Berman of Pitchfork said that !!! "[have not] lost their flair for infusing peak-hour hysterics with sobering morning-after rumination." However, in a far more critical review, Josh Gray of Clash described the album as "a terrible party bag: previous experience suggests that it should be full to the brim with party-poppers, balloons and dangerously sugary sweets but, in reality, all it contains is a few loose crayons and a small bar of vegan chocolate."

Track listing

Charts

References

2017 albums
!!! albums
Warp (record label) albums